The 2000–01 Israel State Cup (Gvia HaMedina) was the 62nd season of Israel's nationwide football cup competition and the 47th after the Israeli Declaration of Independence.

The competition was won by Maccabi Tel Aviv who had beaten Maccabi Petah Tikva 3–0 in the final.

By winning, Maccabi Tel Aviv qualified to the 2001–02 UEFA Cup, entering in the qualifying round.

Results

Seventh Round

Byes: Hapoel Majd al-Krum, Ironi Ofakim, Maccabi Isfiya, Maccabi Tur'an.

Intermediate Round

Eighth Round

Round of 16

Quarter-finals

Semi-finals

Final

References
100 Years of Football 1906-2006, Elisha Shohat (Israel), 2006, pp. 313-14
Israel Cups 2000/01 RSSSF

Israel State Cup
State Cup
Israel State Cup seasons